Regis College may refer to:

 Regis College (Massachusetts), Weston, Massachusetts
 Regis College (Toronto), a postgraduate theological college of the University of Toronto
 Regis University, Denver, Colorado, formerly known as Regis College